Doublast is the second extended play by South Korean girl group Kep1er. The EP was released by Wake One Entertainment on June 20, 2022, and contains five tracks, including the lead single "Up!".

Background and release
On June 3, Wake One Entertainment announced Kep1er would be releasing their second extended play titled Doublast on June 20. Four days later, the promotional schedule was released. On June 10, the track listing was released with "Up!" announced as the lead single. Three days later, the highlight medley teaser video was released. The music video teaser for lead single "Up!" was released on June 16 and 17.

Composition
Doublast consists of five tracks and incorporates various genres of punk, house, minimal pop, moombahton, dance pop, and contemporary R&B.

Promotion
Following the release of Doublast, Kep1er held a live showcase on the same date to introduce the extended play where they performed "Up!".

Track listing

Charts

Weekly charts

Monthly charts

Year-end chart

Release history

References

External links
 

Kep1er albums
2022 EPs
Korean-language EPs
Wake One Entertainment EPs